Conor Bowe is an Irish hurler who plays his club hurling for Moyne-Templetuohy and at inter-county level with the Tipperary senior hurling team.

Career
Bowe made his debut for the Tipperary senior team on 26 February 2022 when he came on as a substitute and scored a point in the third round of the 2022 National Hurling League against Dublin in a 0–21 to 2–16 defeat.
He made his championship debut on 17 April 2022, starting against Waterford in the opening round of the 2022 Munster Hurling Championship.

Honours
Tipperary
All-Ireland Under-21 Hurling Championship (1): 2019 
Munster Under-20 Hurling Championship (1): 2019

Moyne-Templetuohy
Tipperary Intermediate Hurling Championship (1): 2021

References

Living people
Tipperary inter-county hurlers
Year of birth missing (living people)